George Doughty may refer to:
 George Doughty (politician)
 George Doughty (trade unionist)